The NASCAR Xfinity Series (NXS) is a stock car racing series organized by NASCAR. It is promoted as NASCAR's second-tier circuit to the organization's top level Cup Series. NXS events are frequently held as a support race on the day prior to a Cup Series event scheduled for that weekend.

The series was previously called the Budweiser Late Model Sportsman Series in 1982 and 1983, the NASCAR Busch Grand National Series from 1984 through 2002, the NASCAR Busch Series from 2003 through 2007, and the NASCAR Nationwide Series from 2008 through 2014. Since 2015, it is sponsored by Comcast via its consumer cable and wireless brand Xfinity.

History

The series emerged from NASCAR's Sportsman division, which had been formed in 1950 as NASCAR's short track race division. It was NASCAR's fourth series (after the Modified and Roadster series in 1948 and Strictly Stock Series in 1949). The sportsman cars were not current model cars and could be modified more, but not as much as Modified series cars. It became the Late Model Sportsman Series in 1968, and soon featured races on larger tracks such as Daytona International Speedway. Drivers used obsolete Grand National cars on larger tracks but by the inception of the touring format in 1982, the series used older compact cars. Short track cars with relatively small 300 cubic inch V-8 motors were used. Drivers used smaller current year models featuring V6 motors.

The modern-day Xfinity Series was formed in 1982, when Anheuser-Busch sponsored a newly reformed late-model sportsman series with its Budweiser brand. It was renamed in 1986 to the Busch Grand National Series.

Grand National was dropped from the series' title in2003 as part of NASCAR's brand identity (the Grand National name was later used for the Busch East and Winston West series as part of a nationwide standardization of rules for NASCAR's regional racing; both series are now run under ARCA Menards Series banner after NASCAR purchased the organization in 2018). Anheuser-Busch dropped the sponsorship in 2007; Nationwide Insurance took over the sponsorship for the 2008 season, renaming it the Nationwide Series. The Nationwide sponsorship was a seven-year contract, and did not include the banking and mortgage departments of Nationwide. The sponsorship reportedly carried a $10 million commitment for 2008, with 6% annual escalations thereafter.

On September 3, 2014, it was announced that Comcast would become the new title sponsor of the series via its cable television and internet brand Xfinity, renaming it the Xfinity Series. In 2016, NASCAR implemented a seven-race Chase system similar to the one used in the NASCAR Cup Series.

Xfinity race fields have varied in the number of drivers. Prior to 2013, the grid size resembled its Cup counterpart with 43 cars per race; that year, it shrank to 40 maximum cars. The field was further reduced in 2019 and 2020 to 38 and 36, respectively. During the 2020 season, fields were temporarily increased to 40 cars to accommodate part-time teams that were otherwise unable to qualify due to such sessions being canceled in the wake of the COVID-19 pandemic.

Races held outside the U.S.
On March 6, 2005, the series held its first race outside the United States, the Telcel-Motorola 200. The race was held in Mexico City, Mexico at the Autodromo Hermanos Rodriguez, a track that has held Formula One and Champ Car races in the past. It was won by Martin Truex Jr. On August 4, 2007, the series held its second race outside the United States, at the Circuit Gilles Villeneuve in Montreal, Quebec, another road course. It was won by Kevin Harvick, while Quebec native Patrick Carpentier finished second. In July 2008, NASCAR announced that the Nationwide Series would not return to Mexico City in 2009, and in 2012 they announced that it would not be returning to Montreal in 2013.

Playoffs

In 2016, the NXS and Truck Series adopted a playoff format similar to the NASCAR Cup Series Chase for the Championship. Unlike the Cup Series, whose Chase consists of four rounds, the Xfinity Series and Truck Series both use a three-round format. After each of the first two rounds, the four Chase grid drivers with the fewest season points are eliminated from the grid and Chase contention.

 Round of 12 (races 27–29)
 Begins with 12 drivers who qualify for the Chase grid with 2,000 points, plus the bonus Playoffs' points acquired in regular season.
 Round of 8 (races 30–32)
 Begins with eight drivers, each with 3,000 points
 Championship 4 (final race)
 The last four drivers in contention for the season title will have their points reset to 4,000 points, with the highest finisher in the race winning the NXS title.

Television broadcasting

United States
In the 1980s, races were sparsely shown, mainly by ESPN if they were covering the cup race at the same track. Starting in 1990, more races began to be shown. By the mid-1990s, all races were shown. Most standalone races were aired on TNN, which helped grow coverage of the series, while races that were companion races with Winston Cup dates mostly aired on the network airing the Cup race. TNN aired some of these races, which also aired on CBS, NBC, ESPN, ABC and TBS.

From 2001 until 2006, Fox Sports covered the entire first half of the Busch Grand National season, while  NBC and TNT both aired races during the second half, with Turner Sports producing all the coverage for both networks. However, in even numbered years, coverage was changed, with the opening race at Daytona airing on NBC in 2004, on TNT in 2002 and 2006 (due to NBC's coverage of the Winter Olympics) and the track's July race airing on FX. Large portions of Fox’s coverage aired on sister network FX, with a few marquee events on the network itself.

From 2007 until 2014, ESPN was the home of the renamed Nationwide Series. Generally four races per season aired on ABC, with the remainder on ESPN, ESPN2, and ESPNews. Early in ESPN's run, ESPN Classic was used for NNS overflow, however with less carriage of that network, this practice ended. Fox Sports made a return to the series, airing the 2011 Bubba Burger 250 at Richmond on Speed Channel, as ESPN gave up its exclusive rights to the race because of programming conflicts.

In 2015, the NXS returned to Fox Sports during the first half of the season. Like the previous time Fox held rights to the series, most of the coverage aired on cable, though this time it aired on FS1. Four races aired on Fox itself until 2019, when all races moved to FS1. The second half of the NXS season is televised by NBC Sports. Four to five races air on NBC itself, while the others air on NBCSN (until 2020) or, during the Olympics, CNBC or USA Network (prior to 2020)(from 2021 on USA Network will do all races not aired on NBC or Fox Sports)

Latin America
The NXS is available in most Latin American countries on cable and satellite TV. Since 2006, (formerly called  SPEED until 2013) carries live coverage of all events. The races are also shown on Fox Sports Latin America, some of them live and some tape-delayed depending on the network's schedule. Televisa Deportes also broadcast a 30-minute recap every Sunday morning on national television in Mexico. In Brazil, BandSports carries all three series.

Australia
Network Ten's additional high-definition service, ONE, began broadcasting races from the NXS live or near live during the 2008 season. ONE continued to air highlights packages of each race until the end of 2014. Broadcasts of the series are now exclusively shown on the Fox Sports pay TV channels.

Canada
All races are live on TSN channels using FOX's or NBC's coverage. Also, races are broadcast on RDS or RDS2 in French using the world feed produced by NASCAR.

Europe
In 2012, Motors TV broadcasts all Xfinity races live, delayed and highlights, until 2018 when the channel ceased operations.

In Portugal, SPORT TV broadcasts every Xfinity races live.

In the United Kingdom, the Xfinity races—in full and highlights—are available on Premier Sports 2.

Asia
All races are live on Sports Illustrated Television channels using FOX's or NBC's coverage with highlights on Fox Sports Asia.

Cup Series drivers in the Xfinity Series

Since the early days of the Xfinity Series, many NASCAR Cup Series drivers have used their days off to drive in the NXS. This can be for any number of reasons, most prominent or often claimed is to gain more "seat time", or to familiarize themselves with the track. Examples of this would be Dale Earnhardt, who won the very first NXS race, and Kyle Busch, who has won the most races in NXS history.

In recent years, this practice had been dubbed "Buschwhacking" by its detractors. The colloquialism originated when Anheuser-Busch was the main sponsor of the series by combining the name "Busch" with the term "bushwhacker," but it has gradually fallen out of use since Anheuser-Busch's sponsorship ended. Other nicknames, such as Claim Jumper (for when Nationwide was the series sponsor), and Signal Pirate (for the current sponsor Xfinity) have never really caught on, although the generic term "Cup leech" is often used after the end of Busch sponsorship.

Critics claim that NASCAR Cup Series drivers racing in the NXS take away opportunities from the NXS regulars, usually younger and less experienced drivers. On the other hand, many fans claim that without the NASCAR Cup Series stars and the large amount of fan interest they attract on their own races, the NXS would be inadequate as a high-tier division. In addition, many NXS drivers have welcomed the Cup drivers because it gives them the opportunity to drive with more seasoned veterans.

In 2007, the NASCAR Cup Series began racing with the Car of Tomorrow, a radically new specification different from the NXS. NASCAR Cup Series drivers have admitted that driving the Xfinity car the day before the race does little to help with the NASCAR Cup Series race, as the cars differ greatly. This loosely resulted in the new Nationwide Series car making its debut in the 2010 Subway Jalapeño 250 at Daytona International Speedway. This car has a set-up closer to the current Cup car and some Cup drivers who have tested the car say it has similar handling characteristics. The new car has gone full-time since the 2011 season. In 2007, six out of the top ten drivers in the final point standings were Cup regulars, with Jason Leffler being the only non-Cup driver in that group to win a race in 2007. This number decreased from 2006 when 8 out of 10 drivers were Cup regulars. The decreased number is attributed to Cup regulars running only partial schedules, allowing for more NXS regulars to reach the top ten in points. However, the champions from 2006 to 2010 were all Cup regulars driving the full series schedule (Kevin Harvick, Carl Edwards, Clint Bowyer, Kyle Busch, and Brad Keselowski). As a result, beginning with the 2011 season, NASCAR implemented a rule stating that drivers could only compete for the drivers' championship in one of three national series (Cup Series, Xfinity, and Truck) of the drivers' choosing.

On October 26, 2016, NASCAR announced plans to limit Cup participation in the lower series starting in 2017. Cup drivers who were competing for points in the Cup Series with at least five years of experience in the series would be allowed to compete in up to ten NXS races, but are banned from racing in the series' regular season finale, Chase, and Dash 4 Cash races.

Xfinity Series cars

In the early 1980s, teams were switching from the General Motors 1971–77 X-Body compact cars with 311-cubic inch engines. Later, teams were using General Motors 1982–87 G-body cars. Ford teams have used the Thunderbird cars consistently.

In 1989, NASCAR changed rules requiring cars to use current body styles, similar to the Cup cars. However, the cars still used V6 engines. The cars gradually became similar to Cup cars.

In 1995, changes were made. The series switched to V-8s with a compression ratio of 9:1 (as opposed to 14:1 for Cup at the time). The vehicle weight with driver was set at 3,300 pounds (as opposed to 3,400 for Cup). The body style changes, as well as the introduction of V-8s, made the two series' cars increasingly similar.

The suspensions, brake systems, transmissions, were identical between the two series, but The Car of Tomorrow eliminates some of these commonalities. The Car of Tomorrow is taller and wider than the Generation 4-based vehicles in the then-Nationwide Series, and until 2010, it utilizes a front "splitter", opposed to a front valance. The Car of Tomorrow also set pole speeds slower than the NXS cars at companion races.

Previously, Busch Series cars used fuel that contained lead. NASCAR conducted a three-race test of unleaded gasoline in this series that began on July 29, 2006, with a race at Gateway International Raceway. The fuel, Sunoco GT 260 Unleaded, became mandatory in all series starting with the second weekend of the 2007 series, with Daytona being the last race weekend using leaded gasoline.

Another distinction between the cars started in 2008: Goodyear had developed a rain tire for NASCAR road course racing in both series but NASCAR had yet to use them under race conditions by the time NASCAR abandoned the program for the Cup Series in 2005 (the Cup Series eventually used rain tires at the 2020 Bank of America Roval 400 and 2021 Texas Grand Prix), but the Busch Series continued to use rain tires in races at Autodromo Hermanos Rodriguez and Circuit Gilles Villeneuve, since the races could not be planned with rain dates. When rain started to fall at the 2008 NAPA Auto Parts 200, the tires were used in the rain for the first time.

Another distinction was added in 2012, when NASCAR changed the fuel delivery system in the Cup cars from carburetion to fuel injection. NXS cars continue to use carburetors. Furthermore, with the Cup Series' switch to Next Gen car in 2022, Xfinity cars (as well as Truck Series vehicles) continues to use traditional five-lug steel wheels and centered door numbers, as opposed to an aluminum center lock wheel and numbers being placed behind the front wheel on the Next Gen Cup car.

Specifications for Generation 4 NXS car

 Chassis: Steel tube frame with integral safety roll cage – must meet NASCAR standards
 Engine displacement:  Pushrod V8
 Transmission: 4-speed manual
 Weight:  minimum (without driver);  minimum (with driver)
 Power output: 650–700 hp (485–522 kW) unrestricted, ≈450 hp (335 kW) restricted
 Torque: 
 Fuel: 90 MON, 98 RON, 94 AKI unleaded gasoline provided by Sunoco 85% + Sunoco Green Ethanol E15
 Fuel capacity: 
 Fuel delivery: Carburetion
 Compression ratio: 12:1
 Aspiration: Naturally aspirated
 Carburetor size: 390 ft³/min (184 L/s) 4 barrel
 Wheelbase: 
 Steering: Power, recirculating ball
 Tires: Slick (all tracks) and rain tires (road courses only if in case of rainy conditions) provided by Goodyear Eagle
 Length: 
 Width: 
 Height: 
 Safety equipment: HANS device, seat belt 6-point supplied by Willans

Xfinity "Car of Tomorrow" (CoT) 

The then Nationwide Series unveiled its "Car of Tomorrow" (CoT) at the July 2010 race at Daytona International Speedway. Before being fully integrated in the 2011 season, it was also used in 2010 races at Michigan International Speedway, Richmond International Raceway and Charlotte Motor Speedway. The Xfinity CoT has important differences from the NASCAR Cup Series CoT, and the now-retired Generation 4 style car. The body and aerodynamic package differs from the NASCAR Cup Series cars, marketing American pony cars from the 1960s such as the Ford Mustang, Dodge Challenger, and Chevrolet Camaro. The change to share the same CoT chassis as the Cup series resulted in the wheelbase being lengthened from 105 to 110 inches

Each manufacturer uses a distinct body design (similar to 1960s muscle cars), built within strict aerodynamic guidelines provided by NASCAR. The Chevrolet car body currently resembles the Camaro SS, after initially running the Impala and then the Zeta-based Camaro (which coincided with GM's Cup car being its four-door Zeta counterpart, the Holden VF Commodore based Chevrolet SS, being used in Cup at the time). Ford uses the Mustang GT. Toyota runs the Camry, reconfigured in 2015 to resemble the current production model. Toyota announced they would be running the Supra starting in 2019, replacing the Camry, which had been run in the series since Toyota joined the Xfinity Series in 2007. Dodge teams used the Challenger R/T model, despite the manufacturer pulling all factory support after 2012 (though it continued in Canada as FCA Canada still supports the Pinty's Series). Following Dodge's exit, smaller underfunded teams continued to run second-hand Challenger chassis without factory support (thus earning the nickname "Zombie Dodges"). As a result of a rules change after the 2018 season, all Challenger chassis were rendered ineligible for competition, as the series made the switch to composite body panels. Since FCA had pulled factory support years earlier, no new body was submitted for competition, ending the possibility of running a Challenger chassis in the series.

Manufacturer representation

Budweiser Late Model Sportsman Series (1982–1983)
Chrysler
Dodge Challenger: 1982

Ford
Ford Fairmont: 1982–1983

General Motors
Chevrolet Malibu: 1982–1983
Oldsmobile Omega: 1982–1983
Pontiac Ventura: 1982–1983

Busch Grand National Series (1984–2002)
Chrysler
Dodge Intrepid: 2002

Ford
Ford Fairmont: 1984–1986
Ford Thunderbird: 1987–1997
Ford Taurus: 1998–2002
Mercury Cougar: 1984

General Motors
Buick Regal: 1985, 1988–1995 (no factory support after 1991)
Buick LeSabre: 1986–1989
Chevrolet Monte Carlo: 1986–1988, 1995–2002
Chevrolet Nova: 1984–1988
Chevrolet Lumina: 1989–1995
Oldsmobile Omega: 1984–1987
Oldsmobile Delta 88: 1986–1987
Oldsmobile Cutlass Supreme: 1988–1995 (no factory support after 1992)
Pontiac Ventura: 1984–1987
Pontiac Grand Prix: 1988–2002

Busch Series (2003–2007)
Chrysler
Dodge Intrepid: 2003-2004
Dodge Charger: 2005–2007

Ford
Ford Taurus: 2003–2005
Ford Fusion: 2006–2007

General Motors
Pontiac Grand Prix: 2003–2005 (no factory support after 2003)
Chevrolet Monte Carlo: 2003–2005
Chevrolet Monte Carlo SS: 2006–2007

Toyota
Toyota Camry: 2007

Nationwide Series (2008–2014)
Chrysler
Dodge Charger: 2008–2010
Dodge Challenger R/T: 2010–2014 (no factory support after 2012)

Ford
Ford Fusion: 2008–2010
Ford Mustang GT: 2010–2014

General Motors
Chevrolet Monte Carlo SS: 2006–2007
Chevrolet Impala SS: 2008–2009
Chevrolet Impala: 2010–2013
Chevrolet Camaro SS: 2013–2014

Toyota
Toyota Camry: 2008–2014

Xfinity Series (2015–present)
FCA US (Chrysler)
Dodge Challenger R/T: 2015–2018 (no factory support)

Ford
Ford Mustang GT: 2015–present

General Motors
Chevrolet Camaro SS: 2015–present

Toyota
Toyota Camry: 2015–2020 (no factory support after 2018)
Toyota Supra: 2019–present

Seasons

Pre-Xfinity Series champions

 Driver in bold has won at least one NASCAR Cup Series championship
 Driver in italics has won at least one NASCAR Camping World Truck Series championship

All-time win table
All figures correct as of the RAPTOR King of Tough 250 at Atlanta Motor Speedway (March 18, 2022.)

See also

 List of auto racing tracks in the United States
 List of NASCAR drivers
 List of NASCAR series
 List of NASCAR teams
 List of NASCAR Xfinity Series champions
 Dash 4 Cash
 NASCAR Camping World Truck Series
 NASCAR Cup Series

References

External links
 

 
Stock car racing series in the United States